GlobalCapital is a news publication covering the global debt and equity capital markets, part of the Euromoney Institutional Investor PLC group.

Its teams in New York, London and Hong Kong provide lively coverage of markets based on the feedback of those who work in them through a wealth of transaction data and archive material from 30 years of primary markets coverage. Euromoney’s GlobalCapital service enables clients to pick up the pulse of their market, to research an issuer, intermediary or asset class or to check out how it is performing relative to its peers.

History
GlobalCapital, previously known as Euroweek, started in 1987. It produced sector specific priced deals datasets, league tables, deal pipelines and people moves, and also had a dedicated Asia filter. An online version was published daily, and a weekly newspaper was published each Friday.  Regular features included 'The Naked Broker', 'Southpaw' and 'EuroWeek View'.

EuroWeek Asia was the publication's dedicated news section on the Asian equity, bond, loans and structured finance markets. This section was edited in Hong Kong and news was updated online daily. It included a weekly column,  Taipan, on Asian Pacific gossip and insider knowledge. This also is now incorporated into GlobalCapital, as part of GlobalCapital's Asia coverage.

Associated with Dealogic, the publication included regular league tables ranking capital market institutions in their sectors. On a four-week rotation the  tables covered the Americas, EMEA, Asia Pacific and the rest of the globe. The publication's website held an archive for all published league tables since 1995.

The publication regularly issued sector-specific reports. Supplements include the Structured Finance Report, Covered Bond Report, Financing supranationals and agencies, Asian Review of the Year and the Review of the Year. The Review of the Year, published in January, analyses capital market activity from the past twelve months.

In March 2014, Euroweek merged with other key capital market publications from the Euromoney Institutional Investor Group: Asiamoney, Total Securitization, SSA Markets and Derivatives Week to form GlobalCapital. GlobalCapital delivers daily services dedicated to the following key market sectors: FIG/Bank Finance including Covered Bonds, Corporate Bonds, Syndicated Loans, Equity, Leveraged Finance, Global Emerging Markets, Securitization and Offshore RMB. GlobalCapital is owned by Euromoney Institutional Investor, a business and financial publisher, who also publish other titles such as Euromoney Magazine and Metal Bulletin.

References

External links 

Business magazines published in the United Kingdom
Online magazines published in the United Kingdom
Weekly magazines published in the United Kingdom
Daily Mail and General Trust
Magazines established in 2014